Loving You is a  Philippine romance film produced and distributed by Regal Films. It was released on August 20, 2008.

Cast

Main cast
 Yasmien Kurdi as Lane Cruz
 J.C. de Vera as Jepoi Gumba
 Jean Garcia as Cyrill Sales
 John Prats as Axel Chua
 Polo Ravales as Tom Base
 Ehra Madrigal as Bry Damire
 Kris Bernal as Tonee Tienza
 Aljur Abrenica as Ryan Peyra
 Sheena Halili as Pinkie
 Andrea Torres as Kim
 Brent Javier as Caleb
 Jeri Neeman as Weej

Supporting cast
 John Lapus as Erich
 Tonton Gutierrez as Virgilio
 Karla Estrada as Lina
 Pinky Amador as Jackie
 Lovely Romero as Aleli
 Pinky Marquez as Cyrill's mom
 Hopia Legaspi as Lala
 Bianca Pulmano as Carol

References

External links
 

2008 films
2000s Tagalog-language films
2008 romantic comedy-drama films
Philippine romantic comedy-drama films
Regal Entertainment films
2008 comedy films
2008 drama films